Slive is a surname. Notable people with the surname include: 

 Michael Slive (1940–2018), American attorney and college sports executive
 Seymour Slive (1920–2014), American art historian